La Chapelle-Baloue is a commune in the Creuse department in the Nouvelle-Aquitaine region in central France.

Geography
The commune lies on the pilgrimage route known as St James's Way.

Population

Sights
 The church of Notre-Dame-de-Lorette, dating from the twelfth century.
 The chateau and some ancient fortifications.
 A fourteenth-century stone cross.

See also
Communes of the Creuse department

References

Communes of Creuse